Declan Hughes (born 27 May 2000), is an Australian professional footballer who plays as a midfielder for Perth RedStar. He made his professional debut on 18 November 2020 for Perth Glory against Shanghai Greenland Shenhua in the 2020 AFC Champions League.

References

External links

2000 births
Living people
Australian soccer players
English footballers
Association football midfielders
Perth Glory FC players
National Premier Leagues players